Suited Caribou Media is a post-production company based in Glasgow, Scotland.

History
Suited Caribou Media was launched on 30 June 2015 by Scottish film editor Chris Quick as an umbrella company to represent his freelance work outside of Quick Off The Mark Productions. Its first project was post-production work on the short film Sectarian Secret Police by Joseph Andrew Mclean. Over the next couple of years, the company provided post-production services for many and varied films and branched out into photography by providing behind the scenes stills during the production of Broken Record.

In October 2015, it was announced that Chris Quick would not continue with Quick Off The Mark Productions following the decision of Mark D. Ferguson to move to Canada. In February 2016, it was given the joint task of taking over as production company for Autumn Never Dies alongside Pentagram Productions UK. On 3 April 2016, the company made its first announcement about the project when it published the cast line up for the film.

The company is possibly best known for its post-production work on Electric Faces which received a Best Writer nomination at the 2016 British Academy Scotland New Talent Awards for director Johnny Herbin. Writing for MovieScramble, John McArthur said:

The spoilist website also added:

In March 2016, photography work by Suited Caribou Media was printed in Digital Filmmaker Magazine in the United Kingdom. The six-page article about the short film Fanatic featured various photographs taken during production of cast and crew. On 18 June 2016, The National newspaper in Scotland also printed pictures from the companies collection in an article about the shows appearance at the 2016 television festival SeriesFest in Denver, USA.

Filmography

See also 
Chris Quick
Quick Off The Mark Productions

References

External links
Official site
Company IMDB Profile

Film production companies of the United Kingdom
Companies based in Glasgow
Mass media companies established in 2013
2013 establishments in Scotland